Iceman is the tenth studio album by Albert Collins, released in 1991 by Virgin Records under the sub-label Pointblank. It was his last studio album before his death from lung cancer, in 1993. 

The album received mixed reviews, with Lloyd Bradley in Q Magazine describing it as "the songs are more interesting than what [Collins] does with them (..) as he operates more like a sideman than the star of the show".

Track listing
All songs written by Albert Collins.

References

1991 albums
Albert Collins albums
Virgin Records albums